Clebit is an unincorporated community in McCurtain County, Oklahoma, United States. A post office opened in Clebit on May 7, 1924. The community was named for sawmill foreman John Clebo.

References

Unincorporated communities in McCurtain County, Oklahoma
Unincorporated communities in Oklahoma